is a private junior college in Kiyotake, Miyazaki, Japan, established in 1965.

External links
 Official website 

Educational institutions established in 1965
Private universities and colleges in Japan
Universities and colleges in Miyazaki Prefecture
Japanese junior colleges
1965 establishments in Japan